Rhenz Joseph Mamuyac Abando (born March 11, 1998) is a Filipino professional basketball player for the Anyang KGC of the Korean Basketball League  (KBL).

College career 
Abando played two years at Philippine College of Science and Technology. He was coached by former Letran Knight Chris Calaguio. He was recruited by Coach Aldin Ayo to play for the UST Growling Tigers.

UST Growling Tigers 
Abando redshirted in 2018. He also played in the PBA D-League in 2019 with UST and represented the team in the UAAP 3x3 basketball championship for Season 81. After the tournament, Ateneo star player Thirdy Ravena called him "a threat to the whole league in the next coming years."

First season with UST and Finals appearance 
In their first game of Season 82, the Tigers attempted 49 threes. Abando had 15 of those attempts, and made five of them for a 22-point debut. In their next game which they won against the UP Fighting Maroons, he had an all-around 12 points, seven rebounds, two assists, and two steals off the bench. For those performances, he was given the first Player of the Week for the season. However, in their rematch with UP in the second round, he was benched by Coach Ayo. The reason was because he was being recruited by two UAAP schools in the middle of the season, and it could have distracted the team. After affirming his commitment to UST, he was able to play again. Against the La Salle Green Archers, he made three straight threes in the fourth quarter to cut the 10 point lead of the Archers down to just one. He almost tied the game for UST, but he had his foot on the line when he made a jumper that could have been the game-tying three. Instead, La Salle escaped with the 80–79. At the end of the elimination round, UST faced off against the FEU Tamaraws to start the step-ladder semifinals. In that game, he and Renzo Subido made back-to-back threes in the third quarter that extended the lead for UST, who eventually came out with the win and were on to the next phase. The Maroons were their next opponents, with UP having the twice-to-beat advantage. In Game 1, he and Soulemane Chabi Yo both led the team in scoring with 17, as their hot shooting led UST to the win. In Game 2, he had 11 points and nine rebounds as UST completed their upset over UP. In the Finals, UST was swept by the Ateneo Blue Eagles in two games. He finished that season with averages of 11.9 points, 5.2 rebounds, and a team-high 1.3 blocks in 18 games played, while averaging just over 23 minutes off the bench.

Sorsogon Bubble 
In 2020, Abando was among the complainants regarding their poor conditions in the Tigers' "bubble" training in Capuy, Sorsogon. He shared that no one from the staff was tending to the players who had become sick during their stay there. During the investigations, he left UST. He and six of his other teammates transferred to different schools.

Letran Knights (2020–2022) 
Abando, along with his UST teammates Ira Bataller and Brent Paraiso transferred to reigning NCAA champion Letran. Before making his decision, he was also recruited by San Beda University, Adamson University, and National University. He chose Letran because of the talent level of the NCAA, he didn't want to face UST in the UAAP, and because he was assured by Coach Bonnie Tan that he wouldn't regret his decision. Before the start of the season, he played for the San Juan Knights in the inaugural Filbasket season.

Championship with Letran 
Entering Season 97, the Knights were the favorites to win the championship. Abando made his winning debut for Letran with 19 points, eight rebounds, four blocks, and a team-high three assists against the CSB Blazers. He only had 11 points and one assist in their win against the Arellano Chiefs, but bounced back with 24 points, five rebounds, four assists and three steals against the Perpetual Altas as the team improved to 3–0. He then led the team with his 18 points and nine rebounds in a win against the San Sebastian Stags as the Knights secured the twice-to-beat advantage. The Knights then went on to complete their sweep of the elimination round with a win over the San Beda Red Lions.

The Knights beat the Altas again in the Final Four to get into the Finals, with Abando leading them with 24 points. In Game 1 of the Finals, he had 13 points and seven rebounds in just under 20 minutes, as he injured his foot following a highlight putback jam in the third quarter. The Knights endured without him in the fourth quarter to pull off the win. The injury was diagnosed as not a fracture, allowing him to recover. Before Game 2, he became the 11th Letran Knight to be crowned MVP, the first since Raymond Almazan in 2013. He also won Rookie of the Year, becoming the 4th player to win both Rookie of the Year and Most Valuable Player of the Year, the first since Mapua's Allwell Oraeme in 2015. Lastly, he was awarded a spot on the Mythical Team along with teammate Jeo Ambohot. He then went on to score eight of his 14 points in the fourth quarter to power the Knights to their 19th NCAA crown via a perfect 12–0 sweep of the season.

Abando finished that season by playing in the NCAA All-Star Game. He also received a Resolution of Congratulations and Commendation from the La Union Provincial Board for his accomplishments that season.

Professional career

Anyang KGC (2022–present) 
On June 28, 2022, Abando signed with Anyang KGC in the Korean Basketball League (KBL). He had originally planned to stay with Letran for his final year there, but his showing against the Korean national team made him change his mind. He had the blessing of Coach Tan, but the coach rued that Anyang had not coordinated with the college before signing him. The contract he signed was worth 237 million won or P13.89 million for just his first year.

On October 3, 2022, Abando scored just two points off a highlight dunk before missing his next six shots in his KBL Cup debut. He then made up for his lackluster debut with 19 points in a win that sent them to the semifinal.

Abando missed Anyang's season opener due to a reported hip soreness. He made his debut on October 30, 2022, in a win over Suwon KT SonicBoom with six points and four rebounds in 10 minutes. He then had a breakout KBL game with 20 points, six blocks and three rebounds in a win over Wonju DB Promy. To follow up that performance, he had 17 points, seven rebounds, and two blocks in a win over the Changwon LG Sakers. In an 89–77 win over Suwon, he had 15 points, three rebounds, and a game-high four blocks. Against the Seoul SK Knights, he scored a career-high 30 points on five-of-seven shooting from three to go with six rebounds, two assists, and two blocks, but KGC still lost by one point to the Knights. After that game, he was held to below five points in his team's next five games. He broke out of the slump by scoring 15 points in a win over the Knights. He then dropped 20 points on seven of ten shooting and two blocks in a matchup against fellow Filipino import RJ Abarrientos and the Ulsan Hyundai Mobis Phoebus, which he won. On January 15, 2023, he won the Slam Dunk Contest and along with fellow Filipino imports Abarrientos and SJ Belangel, won the 3x3 All-Star Game. Abando then won the 2023 EASL Champions Week pre-season tournament with Anyang, putting up 11 points and two rebounds in a 90–84 win. Back in the KBL, on March 10, he had 28 points against the Seoul Samsung Thunders in an 82–79 loss.

Career statistics

College 

As of the end of Season 97
|-
| align="left" | 2021–22
| align="left" | Letran
| 12 || 18.8 || .396 || .259 || .843 || 6.8 || 1.7 || .8 || 1.2 || 15.6
|-class=sortbottom
| align="center" colspan=2 | Career
| 12 || 21.6 || .396 || .259 || .843 || 6.8 || 1.7 || .8 || 1.2 || 15.6

National team career 
In 2022, Abando got to play for the Philippine national team in a pair of friendlies against Korea. He was also in the lineup for the third window of the 2023 FIBA Basketball World Cup qualifiers. He originally was a reserve for the 2022 FIBA Asia Cup., but after Dwight Ramos suffered from shin splints that forced him to drop out, he was included into the roster. In that tournament, they failed to qualify for the quarterfinals.

Personal life 
Abando has a brother, Jorel.

References

External links 
 Profile at FIBA website

1998 births
Living people
Anyang KGC players
Basketball players from La Union
Filipino expatriate basketball people in South Korea
Filipino men's basketball players
Letran Knights basketball players
Philippines men's national basketball team players
Shooting guards
Small forwards
UST Growling Tigers basketball players
Korean Basketball League players